Keratin 13 (or cytokeratin 13) is a protein that in humans is encoded by the KRT13 gene.

Keratin 13 is a type I cytokeratin, it is paired with keratin 4 and found in the suprabasal layers of non-cornified stratified epithelia. Mutations in the gene encoding this protein and keratin 4 have been associated with the autosomal dominant disorder White Sponge Nevus.

References

Further reading

Keratins